The National Assembly Building (also colloquially the Parliament in Ljubljana, the capital of Slovenia, is a modernist palace housing the legislature of Slovenia. It is located on the Republic Square in the center of Ljubljana. Annual visitor numbers are around 13,000.

Despite its name, the building houses both the National Assembly (lower house) and the National Council (upper house) of the legislature. The building is an officially protected monument, listed in the records as the People's Assembly Building of the Republic of Slovenia. It was opened on 19 February 1959 as the Palace of the People's Assembly, as it was originally the seat of the Socialist Republic of Slovenia's legislature, the People's Assembly.

Construction

The Cathedral of Freedom is an unrealised project of the Slovenian Parliament building, designed by the architect Jože Plečnik in 1949. A new legislature building was thereafter planned by the architect , a much more conservative and modest design than either of the Plečnik concepts, being an austere modernist palace with no monumental elements or decorations save a large sculptural group of bronze figures framing its main portico.

Work began in 1954 on construction of the building to Glanz's plans, using Tehnika, a Ljubljana construction firm. Part of the ethos was that local building materials should be used, such as wood, stone and marble. 27 master craftsmen were also used for the metalwork and joinery. It was completed in 1959.

Opening
The building, opened as the Palace of the People's Assembly, hosted the first session of the People's Assembly of the People's Republic of Slovenia on 19 February 1959.

For its first 32 years, the building held meetings of the Assembly of the Socialist Republic of Slovenia. Following the independence of Slovenia in 1991, it gave way to use by the Slovenian Parliament: both the National Assembly and the National Council.

Design

Exterior architecture

The four-storey building is externally austere. A freestanding cube, the main façade faces Republic Square and is inlaid with Karst marble, with green Oplotnica granite below each window.

Interior

Inside, the building is furnished with paintings and frescoes by a selection of Slovenian artists. The largest, a  wall painting by the 20th century mural artist Slavko Pengov, extends across the length of the entrance hall and illustrates the history of Slovenians. Created in 1958 and 1959, the mural portrays events including the Revolutions of 1848, the First World War and the 1918 creation of the Kingdom of Serbs, Croats and Slovenes, the Second World War and national liberation, and the creation of socialist Yugoslavia and homeland reconstruction. The walls of the first-floor corridor are furnished with portraits of former Presidents of the National Assembly. Following the 1991 independence of Slovenia, the building's interior has been refurbished several times to suit the desideratum of the new Slovenian Parliament.

Formerly rectangular, it was renovated into an amphitheater in 2000. Each seat has a microphone, an automatic voting system, plug socket and access to the National Assembly's computer network. The chair facing the doors to the hall is for the President of the National Assembly. Behind it, a bronze relief of the coat of arms of Slovenia is positioned on the marble wall. The sculptor Marko Pogačnik created the work in 1991 to celebrate independence. There is also a 106-seat gallery for the public and guests to view the Great Hall.

The National Council holds its meetings in the Small Hall, on the ground floor. The room is also used for public presentations and conferences.

Incidents

On 18 May 2010, the front façade of the building, made of rare green tonalite, was severely damaged by students who threw granite rocks removed from a nearby pavement at the building's main entrance. The incident happened during a large student protest against the proposed law on the introduction of mini jobs that would curb student work and changes to scholarship policy. Repairs to the building were estimated at 27,000 euros.

References

External links

 Slovene Parliament building. Virtual panoramas. Burger.si. Accessed 28 February 2011.
 Palače Ljudske skupščine. 60. obletnica zgradbe // Republika Slovenija. Državni zbor

Buildings and structures completed in 1959
Assembly
Assembly
Assembly
Legislative buildings in Europe
Seats of national legislatures
20th-century architecture in Slovenia